Mihaliç can refer to:

 Mihaliç Peyniri, an aged sheep's milk cheese from Turkey
 Old name of Karacabey, a town in northwestern Turkey

See also
 Mihalić (disambiguation)
 Mihalıççık, town in central Turkey